Maha guru (Great Guru) may refer to:

People
Rinchen Zangpo (958–1055), translator of Sanskrit Buddhist texts into Tibetan

Films 
Mahaguru (1985 film), Hindi film
Mahaguru (2007 film), Bengali film